Cerros de Arroyo Hondo is a Sector in the city of Santo Domingo in the Distrito Nacional of the Dominican Republic. This neighborhood is populated in particular by individuals from the upper class.

Sources 
Distrito Nacional sectors 

Populated places in Santo Domingo